Sinesipho Dambile (born 2 March 2000) is a South African sprinter competing primarily in the 200 metres. He competed in the 200 metres at the 2022 World Athletics Championships.

Personal bests
Outdoor
100 metres – 10.29 (Pretoria 2020)
200 metres – 20.29 (Eugene 2022)
300 metres – 32.10 (Pretoria 2020)
400 metres – 46.48 (Pretoria 2019)

References

2000 births
Living people
South African male sprinters